City from Above (2009) is a mini-album by the Dutch rock band The Gathering. It is limited to 2,000 copies.

The song "Miniature" uses samples from the 1963 "The Twilight Zone" TV-series, episode 8, also called "Miniature". Around the 2 minute and 40 seconds mark of the song, dialogue from the episode can be heard.

Track listing

Credits 
Lyrics by – Marcela Bovio (tracks: 3, 4), Silje Wergeland (tracks: 1, 2)
Mastered by – Paul Matthijs Lombert (tracks: 3, 4, 5), René Rutten (tracks: 1, 2), Zlaya Hadzich (tracks: 1, 2)
Mixed by – René Rutten, Zlaya Hadzich (tracks: 1, 2)
Producer – René Rutten

References 

The Gathering (band) albums
2009 EPs